Muralidhar Jena  is an Indian politician. He was elected to the Lok Sabha, the lower house of the Parliament of India from Bhadrak in Odisha as a member of the Indian National Congress.

References

External links
 Official biographical sketch in Parliament of India website

Indian National Congress politicians
India MPs 1996–1997
Lok Sabha members from Odisha
Living people
1949 births